was a Japanese politician who served as minister of health and welfare, construction minister, head of the Environment Agency and head of the Japan Renaissance Party.

Born in Niigata City as the son of House of Representatives member Kuniji Ozawa, and a graduate of Tokyo Imperial University's Law Department (School of Political Science), Ozawa joined the Home Ministry upon graduation. When that ministry was abolished in 1947, he was transferred to the Welfare Ministry.

He first won a seat in the House of Representatives in 1960 (on an LDP ticket) and served 13 consecutive terms.

In 1994, he founded the Niigata University of International and Information Studies, whose head he was until his death.

Between 1998 and 2000 he led the Kaikaku Club political party.

Awards
 Grand Cordon of the Rising Sun, First Class (2000)

References

|-

|-

|-

1916 births
2013 deaths
Japanese politicians
People from Niigata (city)